Ischnocnema nasuta is a species of frog in the family Brachycephalidae.
It is endemic to Brazil.
Its natural habitats are subtropical or tropical moist lowland forest, subtropical or tropical moist montane forest, and plantations .
It is threatened by habitat loss.

References

nasuta
Endemic fauna of Brazil
Amphibians of Brazil
Taxonomy articles created by Polbot
Amphibians described in 1925